Europe is a geographical continent containing the westernmost peninsulas of Eurasia. 

Europe may also refer to:
 Continental Europe, the mainland of Europe excluding the islands surrounding it
 European Union, a European political supranational entity

Greek mythology
 Europa (Greek myth), or Europe, several figures in Greek mythology, including:
 Europa (consort of Zeus), a lover of Zeus
 Europa, one of the Oceanids
 Europa, one of the many consorts of Danaus, mother of several of the Danaïdes
 Europa (daughter of Tityos), possible mother of Euphemus by Poseidon
 Europa, one of the possible consorts of Phoroneus
 Europa (daughter of Laodicus), one of the sacrificial victims of Minotaur
 Europa, a surname of Demeter

Literature
 Europe (magazine), a French literary journal founded in 1923 by Romain Rolland
 "Europe" (short story), an 1899 short story by Henry James
 Europe: A History, a 1996 book by Norman Davies
 Europe a Prophecy, a 1794 prophetic book by William Blake
 Europe, a 1987 play by Michael Gow

Music
 "Europe" (anthem), the national anthem of the Republic of Kosovo
 Europe (band), a Swedish hard rock band
 Europe (Allo Darlin' album), 2012
 Europe (Europe album), 1983
 Europe (Ghost Mice album), 2006
 Europe (Paul Motian album), 2001
 James Reese Europe (1880–1919), American ragtime and early jazz bandleader, arranger, and composer

Other uses
 Europe (1803 EIC ship), a British East Indiaman
 Europe (dinghy), a one-person dinghy designed in 1960
 Europe (Paris Métro), a railway station in Paris, France
 Europe: A Natural History, a 2005 British nature documentary TV series
 Team Europe, several unified teams representing Europe in international sporting competitions

See also
 
 European (disambiguation)
 Europa (disambiguation)
 EU (disambiguation)
 Euro (disambiguation)
 

is:Europe